is a Japanese male curler.  At the national level, he is a 2010 Japan men's champion curler.

Teams

References

External links

Living people
Japanese male curlers
Japanese curling champions
Year of birth missing (living people)
Place of birth missing (living people)